Church of St. Benedict the Moor may refer to:
 Church of St. Benedict the Moor (Pittsburgh), Pennsylvania, United States
 St. Benedict the Moor's Church (New York City)